Punctodera chalcoensis is a plant pathogenic nematode infecting oat.

References

External links 
 Nemaplex, University of California - Punctodera

Tylenchida
Plant pathogenic nematodes
Oats diseases